Ingeborg "Inge" Appelt (born 1 January 1943) is a Croatian actress. She appeared in more than eighty films since 1967.

Selected filmography

References

External links 

1943 births
Living people
Croatian film actresses
People from Osijek